Konçi is an Albanian surname. Notable people with the surname include:

 Eqrem Konçi (1937–1997), Albanian chess master
  (born 1973), Albanian singer and songwriter
 Zyber Konçi (1927–2015), Albanian football coach

Albanian-language surnames